Hammill is a surname. Notable persons with that surname include:
Adam Hammill, English footballer
Caleb Wild Hammill, one of the founders of the stockbrokerage and banking investment firm of Shearson, Hammill & Co.
Ching Hammill, American football player
Ellen Hammill, writer of and actor in Joey (1986 film)
Eric Hammill, farmer and former politician on Prince Edward Island
Frank Hammill, American politician
Gerry Hammill, former member of Chocolate USA
Henry Hammill Fowler, American lawyer and politician
John Hammill, governor of Iowa
John Hammill, first drummer of Pussy Galore
Peter Hammill, English singer-songwriter and a founding member of Van der Graaf Generator

See also
Hammill Brickworks, in the Kent Coalfield, England
Shearson, Hammill & Co., a Wall Street brokerage and investment banking firm
Hamill, a surname
Ó hÁdhmaill, a surname
Hammil, California

Surnames
Anglicised Irish-language surnames